Hrochoť is a village and municipality of the Banská Bystrica District in the Banská Bystrica Region of Slovakia.

Etymology
The etymology is not completely clear. Slovak (dialect) hrochotať - to make a noise, hrochoť - a sharp noise sound (i.e. compare with Russian грохотать). Rudolf Krajčovič associates the name with pastoralism and the sound of the whip. There are also other meanings of the word.

Economy
It is one of the touristic startpoints to Poľana region. The village mostly preserves its architecture from the beginning of the 20th century, consisting of typical wooden houses. Many people work in the neighboring Zvolen.

References

External links
http://www.tourist-channel.sk/hrochot/
http://www.e-obce.sk/obec/hrochot/hrochot.html

Villages and municipalities in Banská Bystrica District